England A may refer to the following second-string England national sports teams:
England A (cricket), since 2007 called the England Lions
England A (rugby league), since 2011 superseded by the England Knights
England A (rugby union), since 2006 called the England Saxons

See also
England B national football team